Charles Augustus Strong (28 November 1862 – 23 January 1940) was a philosopher and psychologist. He spent the earlier part of his career teaching in the United States of America, but he later settled in Italy, near Florence, and it was there between 1918 and 1936 that he wrote most of his works.

Early life and education

Charles Augustus Strong was born in America on 28 November 1862, at Haverhill, Massachusetts. He was the eldest son of Augustus Hopkins Strong. In 1865 his father moved the family to Cleveland, Ohio, where they became acquainted with the family of John D. Rockefeller. Strong received education at the Rochester Theological Seminary, where his father was president. He entered the Phillips Exeter Academy in Exeter, New Hampshire. Strong was a student of Latin and Greek, and edited the school paper. In July 1881 he travelled to Germany, where he studied at the Gütersloh Gymnasium.

In 1883 he returned to America and entered the University of Rochester, where he received an AB in 1884 and an LLD in 1919. Strong graduated from Harvard in 1885 with a second AB. At Harvard he was influenced by the philosopher and psychologist, William James, and became friends with George Santayana; and together they founded the Harvard Philosophical Club.

From 1885 to 1886 he returned to the Rochester Theological Seminary, which was still headed by his father. In 1886 Strong headed to Berlin with George Santayana on a James Walker Fellowship from Harvard. Strong turned away from a career as a clergyman. In Berlin he studied psychology, philosophy, and physiology with professors Carl Stumpf and Friedrich Paulsen.

Career

On his return to America. Strong worked part-time as an instructor in philosophy at Cornell University. Strong went to Paris, Freiburg and Berlin in 1889. In 1890 Strong became a docent at Clark University, and was appointed associate professor of psychology at the University of Chicago in 1892. Chicago's first psychological laboratories were set up by Strong in 1893.

Strong moved on to Columbia University, where he lectured in psychology until 1903 and from 1903 to 1910 was a professor of psychology. In 1903 he authored his first work, Why the Mind Has a Body.

Organizations

He was a member of the Century Club of New York.

Philosophy

In The Origin of Consciousness (1918), Strong advocated a form of panpsychism. The book expanded on William Kingdon Clifford's mind-stuff theory. Philosopher David Skrbina has noted that "Strong stands out as one of the more consistent and open advocates of panpsychism in the first part of the century."

Publications

Why the Mind Has a Body (1903)
The Origin of Consciousness (1918) 
Essays in Critical Realism (1920) 
The Wisdom of the Beasts (1921)
A Theory of Knowledge (1923) 
Essays on the Natural Origin of the Mind (1930)
A Creed for Sceptics (1936)

Personal life

In 1889, Strong married Bessie, the daughter of John D. Rockefeller.

In 1906, on the death of his wife, Strong moved with his daughter Margaret to Fiesole, Italy, near Florence. He died on 23 January 1940 near his Villa Le Balze, in Fiesole. The villa was left to Georgetown University by his daughter, Margaret Rockefeller Strong de Larraín, Marquesa de Cuevas, for the establishment there of the Charles August Strong Center for Scholarship.

Further reading
Krzysztof Piotr Skowroński (2006).  C.A. Strong and G. Santayana in Light of Archive Material. Overheard in Seville: Bulletin of the Santayana Society, vol. 24, pp. 23-27.

References

1862 births
1940 deaths
Rockefeller family
People from Haverhill, Massachusetts
University of Rochester alumni
Harvard University alumni
University of Chicago faculty
Columbia University faculty
Colgate Rochester Crozer Divinity School alumni
Colgate Rochester Crozer Divinity School faculty
American emigrants to Italy
Panpsychism
Clark University faculty
Phillips Exeter Academy alumni